Saraca indica, commonly known as the asoka tree, ashok or simply asoca, is a plant belonging to the subfamily Detarioideae of the family Fabaceae. The original plant specimen from which Carl Linnaeus described the species came from Java, but the name S. indica has been generally incorrectly applied to S. asoca since 1869. It can be distinguished from S. asoca by its non-clasping bracteoles, a lower number of ovules, slightly smaller pods, and a more eastern geographic distribution.

The seeds are eaten by monkeys and squirrels, and Thai people eat the flowers and leaves of one variety of the species.

Saraca is sometimes confused with the false ashoka, Monoon longifolium, which is a lofty evergreen tree native to India. It exhibits symmetrical pyramidal growth with willowy weeping pendulous branches and long narrow lanceolate leaves with undulate margins. The false ashoka tree is known to grow over 30 ft in height.

References

indica